Jakov Milatović (born 1986) is a Montenegrin economist who served as the minister of economy and economic development in the Montenegrin cabinet of Zdravko Krivokapić from 4 December 2020 until 28 April 2022.

Biography

Early life and education
Milatović was born in Titograd, SR Montenegro, SFR Yugoslavia, where he graduated elementary and secondary school Gymnasium "Slobodan Škerović". His grandfather and great-grandfather fought in World War II as Yugoslav Partisans. He completed his undergraduate studies in the field of economics at the Faculty of Economics of the University of Montenegro. He spent one academic year at Illinois State University as US Fellow; one semester at the Vienna University of Economics and Business (WU Wien) as Government of Austria Fellow; one academic year at the Sapienza University of Rome (La Sapienza) as EU Fellow. 

Milatović completed his Master’s degree in economics (MPhil in Economics) at Oxford University. He was a British Government Chevening Scholarship Fellow. He was also a fellow of the German Konrad Adenauer Foundation.  
 
Milatović is fluent in English, speaks Italian and Spanish.

Economics career

Milatović worked at NLB Group Podgorica, and Deutsche Bank, Frankfurt. In 2014 he joined the European Bank for Reconstruction and Development in the team for economic and political analysis. In 2019 he was promoted  to the principal economist for the EU countries, including Romania, Bulgaria, Croatia and Slovenia, and was based at the Bank’s office in Bucharest. 

He has published a number of articles and co-authored two books.

Political career
He served as the Minister of Economy and Economic Development in the Krivokapić Cabinet from 4 December 2020 to 28 April 2022. During his term, Milatović and finance minister Milojko Spajić presented and implemented the controversial "Europe now" economic reform program.

In 2022, Milatović and Spajić founded the Europe Now political party, which participated in the 2022 local elections. Milatović headed the organizations electoral list in Podgorica as its mayoral candidate.

In March 2023, Milatović ran as a candidate of Europe Now in the 2023 Montenegrin presidential election.

Political positions 
Milatović voted for the independence of Montenegro at the 2006 independence referendum. He supports the accession of Montenegro to the European Union. He advocates closer relations between Montenegro and Serbia.

References

People from Podgorica
Government ministers of Montenegro
University of Montenegro alumni
Alumni of the University of Oxford
1986 births
Living people